Platynini is a large tribe of ground beetles in the family Carabidae. There are at least 190 genera and 3000 described species in Platynini.

See also
For a list of Platynini genera, see Platyninae.

References

Carabidae